The 1973 Isle of Ely by-election was a parliamentary by-election held on 26 July 1973 for the British House of Commons constituency of Isle of Ely.

The by-election took place during the 1970s Liberal Party revival. This seat and Ripon were gained on the same day, the third and fourth Liberal gains during the Parliament. This was the first time since 1899 that the Liberal Party had made two by-election gains on the same day, when it won both seats in a two-member constituency at the Oldham by-election. The last time the party had gained two seats, in different constituencies on the same day, was on 2 June 1896, at the Frome and the Wick Burghs by-elections.

Previous MP 
The seat had become vacant on the death of the constituency's Member of Parliament (MP), Major Sir Harry Legge-Bourke KBE (16 May 1914 – 21 May 1973). Legge-Bourke, a Conservative, had gained the seat from the Liberal Party in the 1945 general election.

Candidates 
Three candidates were nominated. The list below is set out in descending order of the number of votes received at the by-election.

The Liberal Party candidate was Clement Freud. He was the grandson of Sigmund Freud and a well-known writer and broadcaster.

Freud won the by-election, in a seat which his party had not contested in the 1970 general election. He retained the constituency until it was renamed in 1983, with most of the territory incorporated into the constituency of North East Cambridgeshire. Freud retained that seat until he was defeated in the 1987 general election.

The Conservative candidate was J. B. Stevens, who had contested Birmingham Stechford in the 1970 general election. Stevens again lost to Clement Freud, in Ely, at the February 1974 general election.

The Labour Party was represented by B. A. Young.

Votes

See also
 Isle of Ely constituency
 List of United Kingdom by-elections
 United Kingdom by-election records

References

 British Parliamentary Election Results 1950-1973, compiled and edited by F. W. S. Craig (Parliamentary Research Services 1983)
 Chronology of British Parliamentary By-Elections 1833-1987, compiled and edited by F. W. S. Craig (Parliamentary Research Services 1987)
 Twentieth-Century British Political Facts 1900-2000, by David Butler and Gareth Butler (Eighth edition: Macmillan Press 2000)
 Who's Who of British Members of Parliament, Volume IV 1945-1979, edited by M. Stenton and S. Lees (Harvester Press 1981)

Isle of Ely by-election
Isle of Ely by-election
Isle of Ely by-election
By-elections to the Parliament of the United Kingdom in Cambridgeshire constituencies
Ely, Cambridgeshire
20th century in Cambridgeshire